Football Superstars was a free-to-play massively multiplayer online football game originally developed by Monumental Games and published by Cybersports. Since late 2014 until its closure in February 2020, the game had been developed and published by Coli Games UK.

The game closed in February 2020 after a loss of player activity and server problems, though no formal announcement was ever made.

A new game project titled 'The Final Third' has been currently under development since September 2020; the release date is unknown.

Development
The BETA version of Football Superstars was released in November 2008, with community members providing feedback to the overall gameplay elements; the official release launched December 31, 2008. Several updates and patches were made throughout the game's lifespan, improving stability and gameplay. 

In 2012, the team had suspended any development of the game, focusing on a Unity-based project called Striker Superstars. In late 2014, Football Superstars game development resumed under its new developer and publisher Coli Games UK until its closure in 2020.

Features 
Football Superstars allowed players to team up with other players globally and play in a PvP environment. The outfield team were human-operated whilst goalkeepers were controlled by the AI. Players could train their “Superstars” to become better players by visiting the gyms, or purchasing upgraded boots and skills. Players could also increase their fame levels by visiting bars and restaurants and purchasing drinks. A higher fame level attributed to greater match rewards.

Virtual Currency 
There were two currencies in Football Superstars; 'Dollars' and 'Credits' respectively. Players earned 'Dollars' by playing competitive games, and could purchase 'Credits' from the official website. Players could also spend `Credits` on Superstar Management. Briefly, players were able to exchange 'Dollars' to 'Credits'.

Subscription 
Football Superstars adopted a free-to-play model with a micro-transaction type monetisation.

Player Managed Clubs (PMC) 
Player Managed Clubs (PMC) were the equivalent of guilds, allowing players to create their own teams, recruit their own players and compete in online events and tournaments against other user-generated PMCs. Within the PMC hierarchy, the manager could nominate Captain, Scouts, Coach, Members and recruits. Each of these roles had a varied level of responsibility in-game.

Superstar Management 
Released in August 2010, Superstar Management allowed players to improve their players stats through the official website.

Fame 
'Fame' was a reward earned by playing competitive matches and making in-game store purchases. 'Fame Points' (FP) was used to upgrade your fame level. There were 28 fame levels; commencing at Local Newcomer to International Superstar. Once you had enough FP, you were allowed the opportunity of in-game newspaper, radio, and TV interviews to boost your fame level.

References 
 Feature in the Telegraph Newspaper
 Guardian Newspaper Game Review

External links 
 Football Superstars Official Website 
 Football Superstars Competitions Website
 Coli Games UK

Massively multiplayer online games